NCO may refer to:

 NCO Group, an international corporation
 National Children's Orchestra of Great Britain
 Net capital outflow, an economic metric
 NetCDF Operators, software
 Network-centric operations, a theory of war in the information age
 Non-commissioned officer, a category of military rank
 Numerically controlled oscillator, a digital signal generator
 Nuova Camorra Organizzata, a defunct Italian criminal organization
 Isocyanate, a functional group of atoms –N=C=O
 Indian National Congress (Organisation), a former Political Party in India formally referred as NCO by the Election Commission of India.
 Nevada–California–Oregon Railway, a defunct railway in the western United States